Ache or Aches may refer to:

Ethnography
 Aché, an indigenous people of eastern Paraguay
 Aché language, the language of the Aché people
 Ache language (China)
 Aṣẹ (Cuban spelling: aché), a concept in Orisha belief

People
 Aché Coelo (born 1985), Chadian sociologist and film
 Barry Ache, American neuroscientist
 Ragnar Ache (born 1998), German footballer
 Steve Ache (born 1962), former American football player
 ACHES (born 1994), professional Call of Duty player

Places
Numerous rivers are known as Ache in German, see Aach (toponymy):
 Ache, a right tributary of the Saar (river) near Weidesheim, France
 Ache, a right tributary of the Isar river, Bavaria, Germany
 Berchtesgadener Ache, a tributary of the Salzach river, Bavaria, Germany
 Königsseer Ache, a tributary
 Ramsauer Ache, a tributary
 Brixentaler Ache, a tributary of the Inn river, Tyrol, Austria
 Fuscher Ache, a tributary of the Salzach, Salzburg, Austria
 Kelchsauer Ache, Tyrol, Austria
 Krimmler Ache, a right tributary of the Salzach, Austria
 Leoganger Ache, a Salzburg, Austria
 Leutascher Ache, left tributary of the Isar, Austria and Germany
 Ötztaler Ache, a right tributary of the Inn, Tyrol, Austria
 Stoißer Ache, a river in Bavaria, Germany
 Windauer Ache, a mountain stream in Tyrol, Austria
 Zeller Ache, a river in Upper Austria

Media
 Ache, 1989 album by The Cateran
 "Ache", 1992 song by Jawbreaker from Bivouac
 "Ache", 1992 song by No Doubt from No Doubt
 "Ache", 1993 song by Smashing Pumpkins from Siamese Dream
 Ache (album), 1982 album by You've Got Foetus on Your Breath
 Aché (album), 1982 album by Merceditas Valdés
 Aché II (1988), Aché III (1989), Aché IV (1990), Aché V (1993), albums by Merceditas Valdés
 Ache Records, a Vancouver-based record label
 Aches and Pains, self-help book by Irish writer Maeve Binchy

Other uses
 Ache, common word for a chronic pain
 AChE, the enzyme acetylcholinesterase
 , a Brazilian pharmaceutical company; see Industry in Brazil

See also
 Aach (disambiguation), another German term for river synonym of Ache
 Aceh, a province of Indonesia